The 26th National Television Awards were held on 9 September 2021 at the O2. The ceremony was the first to be hosted by Joel Dommett who replaces David Walliams after only one year. The ceremony was originally scheduled for January 2021, but was pushed to April due to the COVID-19 pandemic; the ceremony was once again postponed to September 2021. The longlist nominations were announced on 25 May 2021 and the shortlist was announced on 17 August 2021.

Performances
 Hrvy feat. Frog, Beagle, Zip, Scarecrow, Squirrel and Carwash from The Masked Dancer and Janette Manrara - "Runaway With It" 
 JLS - "Beat Again", "Eternal Love" and "Everybody in Love"

Awards

Programmes with multiple nominations

Programmes with multiple wins

See also
 2021 in British television
 Impact of the COVID-19 pandemic on television

References

External links
 

National Television Awards
N
2021 in British television
N
National
National Television Awards